This article contains information about the literary events and publications of 1689.

Events
April 30 – Thomas Shadwell becomes Poet Laureate and Historiographer Royal in England.
April/May – Jonathan Swift becomes secretary to Sir William Temple.
May 26 – Matsuo Bashō begins the journey described in Oku no Hosomichi (Narrow Road to the Deep North).

New books

Prose
Richard Cox – 
George Hickes – 
John Locke
Two Treatises of Government (anonymous)
A Letter Concerning Toleration (as by 'P.A.P.O.I.L.A.', in Latin)
An Essay Concerning Human Understanding (dated 1690)
John Selden (died 1654) – Table Talk
Johann Weikhard von Valvasor – The Glory of the Duchy of Carniola (Die Ehre deß Hertzogthums Crain)

Drama
Aphra Behn – The Widow Ranter
 James Carlile – The Fortune Hunters
Sor Juana –  (Love the Greater Labyrinth)
Nathaniel Lee – The Massacre of Paris
 William Mountfort – The Successful Strangers
Thomas Shadwell – Bury Fair
Nahum Tate – Dido and Aeneas
 Matthew Taubman – London's Great Jubilee

Births
January 18 – Charles de Secondat, Baron de Montesquieu, French satirist (died 1755)
January 21 – Daniel Henchman, Colonial American bookseller and publisher (died 1761)
May 26 – Lady Mary Wortley Montagu, English poet and letter-writer (died 1762)
July 9 – Alexis Piron, French epigrammatist (died 1773)
August 19 (bapt.) – Samuel Richardson, English novelist (died 1761)

Deaths
January – William Chamberlayne, English poet and playwright (born c. 1619)
February 21 – Isaac Vossius, Dutch-born collector of manuscripts (born 1618)
April 16 – Aphra Behn, English dramatist, poet and novelist (born 1640)
August 21 – William Cleland, Scottish soldier and poet (killed in battle, born c. 1661)
November 13 – Philipp von Zesen, German poet and hymn-writer (born 1619)
December 13 – Zbigniew Morsztyn, Polish poet (born c. 1628)
Unknown date – Pjetër Bogdani, Albanian-language author (born c. 1630)

References

 
Years of the 17th century in literature